This list of zoos, animal parks, wildlife parks, bird parks and other public zoological establishments  in Germany is sorted by location.

See also
List of zoos

Sources 
 Rolf Stelly (ed.): Ein Zoowegweiser zu westdeutschen Tiergärten Wild u. Vogelparks Aquarienschauen usw, Hamburg o.J. (ca. 1963).
 Karl Lemke: Tiergärten: Zoos, Aquarien, Wildgehege (Tourist Guide), Berlin / Leipzig 1985.
 Heinrich Dathe (ed.): Tiergärten der Deutschen Demokratischen Republik, Berlin 1987.
 Dirk Petzold, Silke Sorge (eds.): Abenteuer Zoo. 550 Zoos, Aquarien und Reptilienhäuser. Der Zooführer für Deutschland, Österreich und die Schweiz'', Graz 2007.

External links 
 www.zoo-infos.de
 Deutsche Tierpark-Gesellschaft (DTG)
 Deutscher Wildgehege -Verband (DWV)
 Verband Deutscher Zoodirektoren (VDZ)
 www.zooliste.de

 
Germany
Zoos